The 2013 season was Lillestrøm's 37th consecutive year in Tippeligaen and their second with Magnus Haglund as manager. They finished 10th in the league and were knocked out of the cup at the Semi-Final stage by Molde.

Season summary
The club has had mixed results in the early season, disappointingly drawing with Sarpsborg 08 at home before beating defending champions Molde away from home.  Following a 0-1 defeat at Åråsen Stadion to Viking, LSK however beat Brann at home to clinch just the fourth win for Magnus Haglund in 17 home games since March 2012. A decent early season was however offset by a dramatic drop in form from the second half of April through May.

Barring a 3-2 win against Start, the team underperformed and won just one out of seven games before a 3-0 home victory against Haugesund in the final match before the summer break. Notably, LSK's defence leaked an incredible 16 goals in five matches after losing club captain Frode Kippe to injury in the Start match.

Lillestrøm's Swedish coach has been under heavy pressure in the first half of the season, following disappointing results and speculation that club legend Ståle Solbakken might be tempted to take over the reins. Lillestrøm's dwindling attendances under Magnus Haglund reached a low point in the home match against Haugesund. The attendance in that match was just 4,106. Attendance-wise, LSK are at a low ebb with an average attendance of just 5,252. The highest average attendance in recent history was 9,018 in the 2007 season. At the time of the summer break, LSK are 9th in the Tippeligaen.

Lillestrøm qualified for the fourth round of the Norwegian Cup after beating 2nd division outfit Kvik Halden 2-0 on 30 May.
In earlier rounds, LSK beat Skedsmo of the division III 4-0 in the 1st round of the cup, then ousted Grorud (division II) 4-2 after extra time in the 2nd round.

Squad

Transfers

Winter

In:

Out:

Summer

In:

Out:

Competitions

Friendlies

Tippeligaen

Results summary

Results by round

Fixtures

Table

Norwegian Cup

Squad statistics

Appearances and goals

|-
|colspan="14"|Players away from Lillestrøm on loan:
|-
|colspan="14"|Players who appeared for Lillestrøm no longer at the club:

|}

Goal scorers

Disciplinary record

Notes

References

Lillestrøm SK seasons
Lillestrom